The 2012 United States presidential election in Louisiana took place on November 6, 2012, as part of the 2012 United States presidential election in which all 50 states plus the District of Columbia participated. Louisiana voters chose eight electors to represent them in the Electoral College via a popular vote pitting incumbent Democratic President Barack Obama and his running mate, Vice President Joe Biden, against Republican challenger and former Massachusetts Governor Mitt Romney and his running mate, Congressman Paul Ryan.

Romney carried Louisiana's eight electoral votes with 57.78% of the popular vote. Louisiana was one of six states where Obama did better in 2012 than in 2008, with his margin of loss decreasing from 18.63% to 17.2%. As of 2020, this remains the last time that a Democrat has won even 40% of the vote in the state. Obama is the only Democrat to ever win two terms without carrying the state at least once.

Primaries

Democratic

President Barack Obama received little opposition in the 2012 Democratic primaries, handily winning overall with over 88% of the vote. However, Tennessee attorney and perennial political candidate John Wolfe Jr. challenged President Obama in the primaries, and received nearly 12% of the vote. Entrepreneur Bob Ely and historian Darcy Richardson also participated, and received a little over 6% and 5% of the vote, respectively. On the date of the primary, President Obama swept nearly every parish in the state, with Wolfe winning LaSalle, Grant, and Cameron parishes. Although Wolfe qualified for four delegates, the Louisiana Democratic Party announced that they would not award the delegates to Wolfe on technical grounds.

Republican

The 2012 Louisiana Republican primary took place on Saturday, March 24, 2012. And the caucuses were held April 28.

Louisiana had 46 delegates to the Republican National Convention. 20 were awarded based on the primary outcome, and the other 26 by the caucuses.

Primary
The 20 delegate allocation was proportional among candidates who received at least 25% of the statewide vote. Candidates who did not reach the 25% threshold lost the delegates they otherwise would have won, and those delegates became uncommitted then.

On March 24, Rick Santorum was declared the winner of the state's primary.

Caucuses, delegate dispute, and ultimate agreement

Although Ron Paul won just 6% of the vote in the primary on March 24 (in which almost 190,000 voters cast ballots), he carried four of Louisiana's six congressional districts in the congressional district caucuses held the following month (in which fewer than 10,000 people took part).

Paul's showing in the April district causes "guaranteed him 12 of the state's 46 national convention delegates and, as important, gave his forces 111 of the 180 delegates to the state convention," which chose the actual delegates to the 2012 Republican National Convention in Tampa, Florida.

In advance of the June 2 Louisiana State Republican Convention in Shreveport, pro-Paul delegates and others clashed with officials and loyalists of the state Republican Party, which "issued supplemental rules on the eve of the convention to keep the Paul forces from wresting more than the 17 delegates which, in their view, was their due." The convention itself was described as a "riotous" and chaotic scene, as the police removed two Paul supporters, arresting one, and the convention devolved into two separate conventions, "as the Paul delegates turned their chairs around and conducted their convention facing one way, while the state party and its loyalists conducted their parallel convention facing the other."

The split convention resulted in two rival slates of 46 delegates. The national Republican Party accepted the slate submitted by Louisiana Republican Party chairman Roger Villere as the official slate. In late July, however, Paul's campaign announced that it would challenge all the Louisiana delegates, asserting that "our rump convention is the legitimate delegation and they have a right to be seated at the Republican National Convention." In its official challenge to the delegate slate filed in August, Paul's campaign likened Villere to the leader of "a North Korean politburo"; in response, the executive director of the Louisiana Republican Party said that Paul's challenge was "full of personal attacks, hyperbole and unfounded assumption." The dispute was to be adjudicated by the Contest Committee of the national Republican Party, with a possible appeal to the full Republican National Committee and then to the Credential Committee of the convention. However, in late August—one week prior to the convention—the Paul campaign made an agreement with the Republican Party of Louisiana in which Paul would get 17 of the state's 46 delegates, with the rest of the state's delegates supporting then-presumptive nominee Mitt Romney.

General election

Results

By parish

By congressional district
Romney won 5 of 6 congressional districts.

See also
 United States presidential elections in Louisiana
 2012 Republican Party presidential debates and forums
 2012 Republican Party presidential primaries
 Results of the 2012 Republican Party presidential primaries
 Louisiana Republican Party

Notes

References

External links
The Green Papers: for Louisiana
The Green Papers: Major state elections in chronological order

Louisiana
United States president
2012